Gainax Co., Ltd. (stylized as GAINAX; ,) is a Japanese anime studio famous for productions such as Neon Genesis Evangelion, Royal Space Force, Gunbuster, Nadia: The Secret of Blue Water,  Kare Kano, FLCL, Magical Shopping Arcade Abenobashi, and Gurren Lagann, which have garnered critical acclaim and commercial success. Evangelion has reportedly grossed over 150 billion yen, or approximately 1.2 billion. In a discussion at the 2006 Tekkoshocon, Matt Greenfield claimed that Evangelion had grossed over 2 billion; Takeda reiterated in 2002 that "It sold record numbers of laserdiscs in Japan, and the DVD is still selling well today", as well as for their association with award-winning anime director and studio co-founder Hideaki Anno. The company is headquartered in Koganei, Tokyo.

Until Neon Genesis Evangelion, Gainax typically worked on stories created in-house, but the studio has increasingly developed anime adaptations of existing manga like Kareshi Kanojo no Jijou and Mahoromatic. Series produced by Gainax are often known for their controversial twist endings. The Animage Anime Grand Prix has been awarded to Gainax for Nadia: The Secret of Blue Water in 1991, Neon Genesis Evangelion in 1995 and 1996, and The End of Evangelion in 1997.

History

Beginnings

The studio was formed in the early 1980s as Daicon Film by university students Hideaki Anno, Yoshiyuki Sadamoto, Hiroyuki Yamaga, Takami Akai, Toshio Okada, Yasuhiro Takeda and Shinji Higuchi. Their first project was an animated short for the 20th Annual Japan National SF Convention, also known as Daicon III, held in 1981 in Osaka, Japan. The short film is about a girl who fights monsters, robots, and spaceships from early science fiction TV shows and films (including Ultraman, Gundam, Space Runaway Ideon, Space Battleship Yamato, Star Trek, Star Wars, and Godzilla) until she finally reaches a desert plain and pours a glass of water on a dried-out daikon radish, which immediately resurrects itself, grows into a huge spaceship, and beams her aboard. Though the short had an ambitious scope, the animation was rough and low-quality.

The group made a much bigger splash with the short they produced for the 22nd Annual Japan National SF Convention, Daicon IV, in 1983. Starting with a better animated recap of their original 1981 short, the short then moves to the girl as a grown woman, wearing a bunny suit and fighting an even wider range of science fiction creatures (including various Mobile Suits from the Gundam series, Darth Vader, an Alien, a Macross Valkyrie, a Pern dragon, Aslan, a Klingon battle cruiser, Spider-Man, and a pan across a vast array of hundreds of other characters) while surfing through the sky on the sword Stormbringer. The action was all set to the Electric Light Orchestra song "Twilight", though the group's failure to properly license the song would prevent the short's official release on DVD (and make the limited laserdisc release of the Daicon shorts very rare and highly sought after items). The Daicon IV short firmly established Daicon Film as a talented new anime studio (albeit small and with only 20 million yen or about US$200,000). The studio changed its name to Gainax in 1985, basing the term "Gainax" on an obscure Tottori Prefecture term for "giant", with the English suffix -x added because it sounded "good and was international".

Gainax's first work as a commercial entity was Royal Space Force: The Wings of Honneamise, released in 1987. Honneamise was (and still is) critically acclaimed and a classic anime movie; however, it had a tepid commercial reaction (Gainax did attempt to develop a sequel beginning in March 1992, but was unable to do it due to lack of funds). The next release, the 1988 OVA Gunbuster, was a commercial success and put Gainax on a stabler footing to produce works like Nadia and Otaku no Video. During this period, Gainax also produced a number of items such as garage kit and adult video games (a major earner which kept Gainax afloat on occasion, though they were sometimes banned).

Evangelion

In 1995, Gainax produced perhaps their best known series, the commercially successful and critically lauded Neon Genesis Evangelion. In the wake of Evangelion's success, however, Gainax was audited by the National Tax Agency at the urging of the Tokyo Regional Taxation Bureau on suspicion of committing tax evasion on the massive profits accruing from various Evangelion properties. It was later revealed that Gainax had concealed 1.56 billion yen worth of income (thereby failing to pay 560 million yen due in corporate taxes) which it had earned between the release of Evangelion and July 1997 by paying closely related companies various large fees, ostensibly to pay for animation expenses, but then immediately withdrawing 90% of the sums from the other company's accounts as cash and storing it in safe deposit boxes (leaving 10% as a reward for the other company's assistance).

Gainax president Takeshi Sawamura and tax accountant Yoshikatsu Iwasaki were arrested on July 13, 1999, and later jailed for accounting fraud. Yasuhiro Takeda later defended Sawamura's actions as being a reaction to Gainax's perpetually precarious finances and the shaky accounting procedures internally:

Sawamura understood our financial situation better than anyone, so when Evangelion took off and the money really started rolling in, he saw it as possibly our one and only opportunity to set something aside for the future. I guess he was vulnerable to temptation at that point, because no one knew how long the Evangelion goose would keep laying golden eggs. I don't think he purposely set out with the goal of evading taxes. It was more that our level of accounting knowledge wasn't up to the task of dealing with revenues on such a large scale.

21st century

In 2004, Gainax marked their 20th anniversary with the production of Diebuster, the sequel to Gunbuster. Gainax's most recent successes on television have been the popular anime series Gurren Lagann (2007) and Panty & Stocking with Garterbelt (2010). In August 2011, Gainax was sued by A.D. Vision, which claimed Gainax's refusal to accept an option payment for the perpetual live-action rights to Evangelion was a breach of contract and had resulted in losing an opportunity to produce the film with a major studio. A.D. Vision has asked to be awarded the live-action rights to Evangelion and any accruing legal fees.

In 2012, Gainax announced it would be producing its first live-action television series, EA's Rock, with director Nobuhiro Yamashita. At the 2013 Tokyo Anime Fair, Gainax announced that they would be making once-dead Blue Uru film with Hiroyuki Yamaga as the director and screenwriter and Yoshiyuki Sadamoto as the character designer. In March 2015, a new studio and museum were opened in Miharu, Fukushima, with the studio named Fukushima Gainax.

In 2016, Gainax was sued by Studio Khara for 100 million yen in unpaid royalties from an agreement that Khara would earn royalties from income received on works and properties that founder Hideaki Anno had worked on. The suit alleged that Gainax delayed on paying royalties and incurred a large debt with Khara, which had loaned 100 million yen in August 2014, but had yet to receive payment on the loan.  In 2017 the suit was ruled on by a judge at the Tokyo District Court which ordered Gainax  to pay the full amount in debt owed to Khara. Further, it was reported that Gainax was not expected to appeal the ruling.  Gainax President, Hiroyuki Yamaga posted a public apology on the Gainax website stating the company was now undergoing restructuring.  To date, Anno claims nobody from Gainax has contacted him personally with any kind of apology or explanation.

In August 2018, it was announced that Fukushima Gainax had been acquired by Kinoshita Group Holdings on July 26, making it Kinoshita's new subsidiary. Fukushima Gainax changed its studio name to Gaina and relocated to Koganei, Tokyo on August 9. In December 2019, representative director Tomohiro Maki was arrested on allegations of quasi-forcible indecency on an aspiring voice actress. Maki had been appointed representative director in October, but had been a board director of the company since 2015 and previously served as head of Gainax International, a separate company that trained voice actors and other talents, at the time of the alleged incidents.

In February 2020, Yasuhiro Kamimura (Groundworks representative director) was appointed the company's new representative director and a new board of directors was hired on to the company with Yuko Takaishi (Kadokawa Anime Business Department Anime Production Division head), Atsushi Moriyama (King Records Rights Division senior operating officer), and Yoshiki Usa (Trigger representative director vice president) being the ones chosen to be at the board. In December 2020, it was reported that Tomohiro Maki has been sentenced to 2.5 years in prison for committing indecent acts.

Filmography

TV series

Films

OVAs and ONAs

Daicon tokusatsu fan films

Other works
Gainax had some involvement with K.O. Beast directed by Hiroshi Negishi. It teamed with other groups to create various works, such as a 1987 promotional video for the song "Marionette" by Boøwy and the 2006 Momoko-based "Gainax Girls" fashion dolls created in collaboration with a Japanese fashion doll. Gainax also collaborated with Game Arts in 1992, resulting in the video game Alisia Dragoon. In 2004, Gainax penned Melody of Oblivion for J.C.Staff. Gainax has also produced a number of computer games, including a strip mahjong game featuring Evangelion characters and its most famous, the Princess Maker series (later adapted as Puchi Puri Yūshi). It collaborated with Saudi Arabian media content company ARiNAT on a three-minute anime trailer titled "Desert Knight" (Sabaku no Kishi), which debuted at the "ANI:ME" Japanese pop culture festival in Abu Dhabi in the United Arab Emirates. Gainax also created the Mahoromatic Digital Maiden 1 - 3 PC game series in 1998 which allowed Konami to publish the PS2 game exclusive Mahoromatic in Japan that is lesser known to the public.

See also

 Gonzo — studio founded by Gainax co-founder Shinji Higuchi and other ex-Gainax staff
 Khara — studio founded by Gainax co-founder Hideaki Anno
 Trigger — studio founded by ex-Gainax staff
 Gaina — previous Gainax subsidiary, formerly known as Fukushima Gainax.
 Shaft — Gainax worked closely with Shaft in the early-to-mid 2000s; ex-Gainax director Shouji Saeki currently works exclusively with Shaft

References

Further reading
 Hernandez, Lea. "The Curse of Urusei Yatsura", interview by PULP magazine, vol. 5, no. 8 (August 2001): 24–29. ISSN 1096-0228.
 Howell, Shon. "The Fabulous Dog and Pony Show: An Interview with Shon Howell". By Ben Dunn. Mangazine, vol. 2, no. 23 (May 1993): 11–18.  Shon Howell was the second vice president of Gainax in charge of United States operations (General Products) after Lea Hernandez (the first) quit.
 Howell, Shon. "The Fabulous Dog and Pony Show". Mangazine, vol. 2, nos. 24 (June 1993), 25 (July 1993), 27 (September 1993), 30 (December 1993), 31 (January 1994), 32 (February 1994).  A column further detailing Shon Howell's experiences with Gainax.
 Leonard, Andrew. "Heads Up, Mickey".  Wired, issue 3.04, April 1995.  An article on anime, focusing on the history of Gainax.

External links

  
 
 

 
Japanese companies established in 1984
Video game companies of Japan
Tokusatsu
Japanese animation studios
Animation studios in Tokyo
Mass media companies established in 1984
Hideaki Anno